The 1969–70 Mitropa Cup was the 30th season of the Mitropa football club tournament. It was won by Vasas who beat Inter Bratislava in the two-legged final 4–1 on aggregate.

Round of 16

|}

Quarter-finals

|}

Semi-finals

|}

Final

|}

See also
1969–70 European Cup
1969–70 European Cup Winners' Cup
1969–70 Inter-Cities Fairs Cup

External links
1969–70 Mitropa Cup at Rec.Sport.Soccer Statistics Foundation

1969-70
1969–70 in European football
1969–70 in Hungarian football
1969–70 in Yugoslav football
1969–70 in Austrian football
1969–70 in Czechoslovak football
1969–70 in Italian football